Volumen Plus is an official DVD released by Icelandic musician Björk on 2 December 2002. The DVD, whose release coincided with the release of the comprehensive Greatest Hits - Volumen 1993–2003, offers those who purchased the original Volumen release an opportunity to own the missing seven videos included on the newer release on DVD at a lower price. It includes all the videos from "Alarm Call" to "Nature Is Ancient", the latter of which being the only video on the release for which there was no corresponding single release, as the video was created only for the promotion of  the Family Tree box-set.

Track listing

References

Björk video albums